Patrick D'Rozario, CSC (born 1 October 1943) is a Bangladeshi prelate of the Catholic Church who was Archbishop of Dhaka from 2011 to 2020. He became a cardinal in 2016, the first from Bangladesh. He led other dioceses in Bangladesh from 1995 to 2010.

Biography
Patrick D'Rozario was born on 1 October 1943 in Padrishibpur, Barisal, British India (now part of Bangladesh). He took his vows as a member of the Congregation of Holy Cross on 14 June 1962 and was ordained a priest by the Servant of God Archbishop Theotonius Amal Ganguly on 8 October 1972.

On 21 May 1990, Pope John Paul II appointed D'Rozario the first Bishop of Rajshahi, a diocese newly created from the Diocese of Dinajpur. He received his episcopal consecration on 12 September 1990 from Bishop Theotonius Gomes of Dinajpur. On 3 February 1995, Pope John Paul named him Bishop of Chittagong. On 25 November 2010, he was appointed Coadjutor Archbishop of Dhaka by Pope Benedict XVI. On 22 October 2011, he succeeded Archbishop Paulinus Costa as Archbishop of Dhaka.

As president of the Catholic Bishops' Conference of Bangladesh, he attended the Synod on the Family in October 2014. He has also served as Chair of the Governing Body of Notre Dame College, Dhaka.

Pope Francis raised D'Rozario to the rank of cardinal at a consistory held on 19 November 2016. He was given the rank of Cardinal-Priest and assigned the titular church of Nostra Signora del Santissimo Sacramento e Santi Martiri Canadesi. He was the second member of his order to join the College of Cardinals, after John O'Hara, Archbishop of Philadelphia, in 1958. Francis made him a member of the Dicastery for Promoting Integral Human Development on 23 December 2017.

Pope Francis accepted D'Rozario's resignation as Archbishop of Dhaka on 30 September 2020.

References

External links
 
Catholic Hierarchy
Holy Cross Congregation

Living people
1943 births
Roman Catholic archbishops of Dhaka
21st-century Roman Catholic archbishops in Bangladesh
Cardinals created by Pope Francis
Congregation of Holy Cross bishops
Congregation of Holy Cross cardinals
Bangladeshi cardinals
Anglo-Indian people
Notre Dame College, Dhaka alumni
20th-century Roman Catholic bishops in Bangladesh
Bangladeshi Roman Catholic bishops
Roman Catholic bishops of Chittagong
Roman Catholic bishops of Rajshahi